The Lancashire Coastal Way is a long-distance footpath following the coast of the county of Lancashire in the north west of England. Its end points are Silverdale in the north and Freckleton in the south.

Route
The walk starts down at Freckleton, heads west along the shore to Lytham St. Annes, continues north along the coast up to Blackpool, then across the Wyre Way over the Glasson Dock harbour inlet (or through Glasson itself on alternative route), then walk along the coast, with Garstang to the east, heading north towards Lancaster, near the Caton Trail and Brookhouse, the walk continues round the coast, keeping west to Morecambe and finally reaching Silverdale at the head of the trail.

From Silverdale the Cumbria Coastal Way offered an opportunity to continue the coastal walk to Gretna, but is no longer a recognised path.

References

External links

Footpaths in Lancashire
Long-distance footpaths in England
Coastal paths in England